A number of ships have been called Bengal Merchant:

Bengal Merchant, a 570-ton sailing vessel between 1676–1693
Bengal Merchant, a 390-ton sailing vessel between 1700–1704
Bengal Merchant, a 503-ton sailing vessel launched in 1812 in Calcutta, hulked in 1856.

Ship names